Saint-René may refer to:

People
Saint-René d'Angers, the French name of a 5th-century Saint and Bishop from Angers
 His Italian counterpart and namesake San Renato di Sorrento
Saint René Goupil, a 17th-century French Jesuit lay missionary from Angers, France who became the first canonized Catholic martyr
Saint-René Taillandier, a French writer and critic

Places
Saint-René, Quebec, a parish in Chaudière-Appalaches, Quebec, Canada
Saint-René-de-Matane, Quebec, a municipality in Bas-Saint-Laurent, Quebec, Canada
Saint René, Federal Republic of Nigeria, West Africa, an independent dependency or territory  possessing an elected leadership.